US Post Office-Parkville Station, originally known as Station "Y," is a historic post office building located at Bensonhurst in Brooklyn, New York, United States. It was built in 1936, and designed by consulting architect Carroll H. Pratt for the Office of the Supervising Architect.  The building is a two-story, flat roofed red brick building with a one-story rear wing in the Colonial Revival style.

It was listed on the National Register of Historic Places in 1988.

References

Parkville
Government buildings completed in 1936
Colonial Revival architecture in New York City
Government buildings in Brooklyn
Bensonhurst, Brooklyn
National Register of Historic Places in Brooklyn
1936 establishments in New York City